Mohanad Najim Aleqabi (born January 6, 1979) is an Iraqi journalist, Director General of the Team Media War of the Popular Mobilization Forces, which is affiliated to the Iraqi Council of Ministers & Founder and CEO Public Opinion News Agency. He was born in 1979. He studied journalism at Mustansiriya University in Baghdad and graduated from it. He is currently the managing director of "Rp News" (Public Opinion News Agency). He also worked for Beladi TV.A former political analyst

Channels and institutions in which he worked 
 Aletejah TV
 Beladi TV
 Asia Network Television
 Aliraqia TV
 Alghadeer TV
 Public Opinion News Agency. And more

See also

 Popular Mobilization Forces
 Team Media War

References

External links
Official Facebook Page

Living people
Writers from Baghdad
Iraqi anti-war activists
21st-century Iraqi journalists
Iraqi Shia Muslims
University of Baghdad alumni
Members of the Popular Mobilization Forces
1979 births